Norfolk & Western is an American indie rock and folk/rock band from Portland, Oregon, United States. They are not to be confused with the fallen flag railroad of the same name. An essential part of their stage set-up and sound is a turn-of-the-century Victrola Grammaphone.  Norfolk and Western began as the recording project of Adam Selzer with friends, including M. Ward, playing various instruments, and evolved over time to become a fully orchestrated band. In the early days Norfolk and Western's sound was whispery, intimate, elegant folk music laced with creaky old instruments and atmospheric sound collages. Their live shows often feature band members switching instruments, sometimes even mid-song, as well as film accompaniment.

Norfolk and Western toured in support of the release A Gilded Age in Spring and Summer of 2006.

Members

Current members
Adam Selzer (Band founder, Songwriter, Guitar, Lead vocals, found sounds, Engineer, Producer, and other instruments)
Rachel Blumberg (Drums, Keyboards, Backing Vocals, Vibraphone, Percussion, and other instruments)

Rotating members
Tony Moreno (Guitar, Banjo, Accordion, Found Sounds, Sound collage, Film)
Amanda Lawrence (Viola, Glockenspiel)
Dave Depper (Bass, Vocals, Piano)
Cory Gray (Trumpet, Piano, Wurlitzer)

Former members
Peter Broderick (Violin, Banjo, Saw, Mandolin, Theremin, Accordion, Lap Steel, Guitar). Joined Efterklang.

The members

Adam Selzer
Adam owns and operates Type Foundry Recording Studio in Portland, Oregon where he has engineered and produced records by such artists as M.Ward, The Decemberists, Little Wings, She & Him, Corrina Repp, Shelley Short, and many more. He is a member of the band Alialujah Choir and also tours with M. Ward playing guitar and bass.

Rachel Blumberg
Rachel Blumberg has been a long-time songwriting collaborator and is now writing many songs of her own which appear on the Norfolk and Western recordings. Blumberg also tours and records with M. Ward playing the drums and ukulele. She was formerly the drummer of The Decemberists and has toured with Laura Veirs.

Dave Depper
Originally from Bend, Oregon, Dave Depper has perfect pitch. He also played in The Village Green and Blanket Music.

Tony Moreno
Tony Moreno recently became a father and has been playing in the band since the inception. Moreno records on his own under his name with several releases to date. He also designs websites, including NorfolkAndWestern.org.

Amanda Lawrence
Amanda Lawrence teaches violin, viola, and cello and is a studio session player. She also plays in the band Pentecost Hotel.

Cory Gray
Cory Gray has been a fixture at Type Foundry Recording Studio as a session piano and trumpet player. He first made his mark in Norfolk on the Dusk in Cold Parlours CD. He leads his own band Carcrashlander and plays with various other bands such as Graves and occasionally tours and records with Darren Hanlon. He also played in the band Desert City Soundtrack.

Peter Broderick
Peter Broderick recently left the band to join the Danish band, Efterklang. Contributed to A Gilded Age. He also plays in the bands Loch Lomond and Horse Feathers.

Discography
 Dinero Severo (2009)
 The Unsung Colony - Released on Hush Records. 24, October 2006. The album was made available for purchase on the Hush Records site before the official release date at the beginning of October.
 A Gilded Age - Released on Hush Records. 2006.
 Dusk in Cold Parlours - Released on Hush Records. 2003
 Winter Farewell - Released on Filmguerrero. 2002.
 Centralia - Released on Filmguerrero. 2000. Out of Print.

References

External links
NorfolkandWestern.org - The Band's Official Website
Concert photos by Laurent Orseau
Flipside Samizdat - The Blog of Adam Selzer
A Plea to get the Band to Milwaukee.
A Review of The Unsung Colony from OnMilwaukee.com

Indie rock musical groups from Oregon
Musical groups from Portland, Oregon
Hush Records artists
1999 establishments in Oregon
Musical groups established in 1999